Martinique Queens is a national beauty pageant responsible for selecting Martinique's representatives to the International pageants. This pageant is not related to Miss Martinique where the winner traditionally competes at Miss France contest.

History

1957-1985
Miss Martinique pageant has been known since 1957, unrelated as above specified to Martinique Queens, when the island competed at the Miss Universe pageant. Since 1984 the island joins Miss France contest as overseas department of the country. In 1985 it boycotts to the Miss Universe pageant, because of the pageant does allow that island competing in a national competition as a region.

Miss Martinique is a different pageant, therefore should not feature on the history of Martinique Queens.

2005-present
Since 2005 Martinique allows winners to compete at the Miss World contest. Moana Saran Luu becomes the national director of the island. In that year she handles the "Martinique Queens" contest to send its winner to the Miss World. While runners-up might compete at the Miss International and Miss Earth pageants.

Titleholders 
Color key

References

External links 
Official site

Martinique
Martinique
Martinique
Recurring events established in 2005
Events in Martinique
Women in Martinique